Jacobus Hermanus Wiese (born ) is a South African rugby union player for the  in Premiership Rugby. He can play as a flanker or a lock.

Rugby career

2013–2015: Schoolboy rugby

Wiese was born and grew up in Upington. He attended and played rugby for Hoërskool Upington, which resulted in provincial call-ups for Griquas Country Districts in 2013, 2014 and 2015.

In 2013, he was included in their Under-16 Grant Khomo Week squad for the tournament held in Vanderbijlpark, starting all three of their matches.

The following year, he was included in the Griquas Country Districts squad that competed in South Africa's premier rugby union tournament at high school level, the Under-18 Craven Week, held in Middelburg. He again started all three of their matches at the tournament and scored one try in their 26–20 victory over Zimbabwe. At the conclusion of the tournament, Wiese was named in the South Africa Schools for the Under-18 International Series. He played off the bench in their 28–13 victory over their counterparts from France in their first match, started their second match – a 40–15 win over Wales – and appeared as a reserve for their 22–30 defeat to England in their final match of the series.

He once again represented Griquas Country Districts at the Under-18 Craven Week in 2015, held in Stellenbosch, starting all three matches and scoring a try in their 54–39 victory over Border Country Districts. He was included in the South Africa Schools squad for the second consecutive season and started in their victories over Wales and France, but missed their final match against England through concussion.

2016–2020: Western Province / Stormers / South Africa Under-20

Wiese joined the academy of the Cape Town-based  for the 2016 season. Although he wasn't included in a provisional South Africa Under-20 squad, he was named in their final squad to compete at the 2016 World Rugby Under 20 Championship in Manchester, England. He started as a lock in their opening match in Pool C of the tournament, as South Africa came from behind to beat Japan 59–19. He appeared as a replacement in their second pool match as South Africa were beaten 13–19 by Argentina, but restored to the starting lineup – this time as a flanker – for their 40-31 bonus-point victory over France in their final pool match. The result saw South Africa secure a semi-final place as the best runner-up in the competition and Wiese played off the bench as they faced three-time champions England in the semi-finals. However, the hosts proved too strong for South Africa, knocking them out of the competition with a 39–17 victory. Wiese started his side's final match against Argentina in the third-place play-off final, but finished on the losing side as Argentina beat South Africa for the second time in the competition, winning 49–19 to condemn South Africa to fourth place in the competition.

He returned to domestic action for the  team in the 2016 Under-19 Provincial Championship. After making a single appearance for the Under-21 team in their match against the Leopards, he returned to the Under-19s to help them qualify for the title play-offs by finishing top of the log, having won 10 of their 12 matches.

At the start of 2017, Wiese was included in the  squad for the 2017 Super Rugby season.

2020–:Sale Sharks
Wiese joined Premiership Rugby side Sale Sharks ahead of the 2020–21 season.

Personal life

He is the younger brother of Jasper Wiese, also a first class South African rugby union player.

References

South African rugby union players
Living people
1997 births
People from Upington
Rugby union locks
Rugby union flankers
Stormers players
South Africa Under-20 international rugby union players
Western Province (rugby union) players
Sale Sharks players
Rugby union players from the Northern Cape